Pranas Mažeika (1917-2010) was a soldier and Lithuanian basketball player

Pranas Mažeika may also refer to:

Pranas Mažeika (politician), viceminister
Pranas Mažeika (scientist), doctor of Techn. Sc.